The American Samoa national baseball team is the national baseball team of American Samoa. They have competed at the South Pacific Games, and have won Silver and Bronze at the event.

South Pacific Games
 2003 :  2nd
 2007 :  3rd

References

See also
Sports in American Samoa

Baseball
National baseball teams